Ken Melvin may refer to:

 Kenneth R. Melvin (born 1952), American politician, lawyer and jurist
 Ken Melvin (The Bill), a fictional character on British serial drama The Bill